The Volkswagen Jetta is a compact car/small family car manufactured and marketed by Volkswagen since 1979. Positioned to fill a sedan niche above the firm's Golf hatchback, it has been marketed over seven generations, variously as the Atlantic, Vento, Bora, City Jetta, Jetta City, GLI, Jetta, Clasico, and Sagitar (in China).

The Jetta has been offered in two- and four-door saloon / sedan, and five-door wagon / estate versions – all as four- or five-seaters. Since the original version in 1980, the car has grown in size and power with each generation. By mid-2011, almost 10 million Jettas have been produced and sold all over the world. As of April 2014, Volkswagen marketed over 14 million, becoming its top selling model.

Nameplate etymology
Numerous sources note that the Jetta nameplate derives from the Atlantic 'jet stream' during a period when Volkswagen named its vehicles after prominent winds and currents (e.g., the Volkswagen Passat (after the German word for trade wind), Volkswagen Bora (after bora), and Volkswagen Scirocco (after sirocco).

A 2013 report by former VW advertising copywriter Bertel Schmitt, said that — after consulting VW sources including Dr. Carl Hahn, former Volkswagen of America Chief and W.P. Schmidt, former sales chief at Volkswagen — no evidence suggested Volkswagen employed a naming theme for its front-drive, water-cooled vehicles; nor was there evidence the names derived from a theme; nor that a naming system "was ever announced, either officially or confidentially."

First generation (A1, Type 16; 1979)

Although the Golf reached considerable success in the North American markets, Volkswagen observed the hatchback body style lacked some of the appeal to those who preferred the traditional three-box configuration. The styling of the 1970 AMC Gremlin was controversial for truncating the Hornet sedan, but Volkswagen stylists reversed the process by essentially grafting a new trunk onto the tail of the Golf to produce a larger Jetta saloon. The Jetta became the best-selling European car in the United States, Canada, and Mexico. The car was also popular in Europe, including the United Kingdom, Germany, and Turkey.

The Jetta was introduced to the world at the 1979 Frankfurt Auto Show. Production of the first generation began in August 1979 at the Wolfsburg plant. In Mexico, the Mark 1 was known as the "Volkswagen Atlantic".

The car was available as a two-door sedan (replacing the aging rear-engined, rear-wheel drive Volkswagen Beetle 2-door sedan in the United States and Canada) and four-door sedan body styles, both of which shared a traditional three-box design. Like the Volkswagen Golf Mk1, its angular styling was penned at ItalDesign, by Giorgetto Giugiaro. Styling differences could be found depending on the market. In most of the world, the car was available with composite headlamps, while in the US, it was only available with rectangular sealed beam lamps due to Federal Motor Vehicle Safety Standard 108 (FMVSS 108). The suspension setup was identical to the Golf and consisted of a MacPherson strut setup in front and a twist-beam rear suspension. It shared its 2,400 mm (94.5 in) wheelbase with its hatchback counterpart, although overall length was up by 380 millimetres (15 in). The capacity of the luggage compartment was 377 litres (13.3 ft3), making the Jetta reasonably practical. To distinguish the car from the Golf, interiors were made more upscale in all markets. This included velour seating and color coordinated sill to sill carpeting.

Engine choices varied considerably depending on the local market. Most were based on 827 engines of the era. Some cars were equipped with carburetors, while others were fuel-injected using K or KE Jetronic supplied by Robert Bosch GmbH.

Volkswagen briefly considered producing the Jetta in a plant located in Sterling Heights, Michigan in the US. However, due to declining sales in North America, the decision was postponed and abandoned in 1982. The site was subsequently sold to Chrysler in 1983 and was in operation . This generation was also produced in SFR Yugoslavia, Bosnia and Herzegovina, under the joint venture Tvornica Automobila Sarajevo (TAS) for the Balkan area.

Second generation (A2, Typ 20E/1G; 1984)

The Mark 2 series is the longest-running Jetta so far. Introduced to Europe in early 1984 and to North America in 1985, the second generation Jetta proved to be a sales success for Volkswagen. The car secured the title of best-selling European car in North America, Farmer's Journal COTY 1991, and outsold the similar Golf by two-to-one in that market. Based on the all-new second-generation Golf platform, the car was larger, heavier, and could seat five people instead of four as in the Mark 1. Exterior dimensions increased in all directions. The suspension setup was basically unchanged from the first generation, although refined slightly, for example by the inclusion of a separate subframe for mounting the front control arms to help noise isolation, as well as improved rubber mountings for all components. Aerodynamics improved considerably, with a drag coefficient of 0.36. With a 470-litre (16.6 ft3) luggage compartment, the trunk had grown nearly as large as some full-sized American sedans. Interior room was also increased 14%, which changed the EPA class from sub-compact to compact.

Cars built in Germany were assembled in a brand new (at the time) plant at Wolfsburg in Assembly Hall 54. The plant was heavily robotised in an effort to make build quality more consistent. New innovations on the second generation included an optional trip computer (referred to as the MFA, German Multi-Funktions-Anzeige), as well as silicone dampened engine and transmission mounts to reduce noise, vibration, and harshness levels. In 1988, a more advanced fully electronic fuel injection system became available. This arrangement is known as the Digifant engine management system.

Like the Mark 1, the second generation was offered as a two-door or four-door sedan. External changes throughout the series' run were few: the front-quarter windows were eliminated in 1988 (along with a grille and door trim change), and larger body-colored bumpers and lower side skirts were added from 1990.

In 2007, Volkswagen of America held a contest to find the diesel-powered Volkswagen with the highest distance traveled on the original engine. The winning car was a 1986 Jetta Turbodiesel found in Blue Rock, Ohio which had . A local dealer verified the odometer reading. Notable on this particular car was that it also had the original muffler despite being located in an area subject to road salt in the winter.

Third generation (A3, Typ 1H; 1992)

For the third generation, the Jetta name was discontinued, and it was officially renamed the Volkswagen Vento in European countries, following the precedent of naming cars after winds, debuted in 1992. The Jetta 3 debuted in North America in 1993 after production delays and quality problems at the Volkswagen plant in Puebla, Mexico. The name "Vento" means "wind" in both Portuguese and Italian. It went on sale in most of Europe in the first quarter of the year, though it did not arrive on the British market until September 1992.

Because of the success of the second generation in North America, Volkswagen decided to keep the Jetta nameplate. However, in Europe the car was given its new name to appeal to a younger market.

Styling was penned by a design team led by Herbert Schafer, and again the car became more aerodynamic than the previous generation. Although visually similar to the Mark 2, there were many refinements underneath. The two-door model was dropped, aerodynamics were improved, with the car now having a drag coefficient of 0.32. This included a new structure which now met worldwide crash standards. Suspensions were an evolutionary rather than revolutionary refinement of the setup on previous editions, and mainly consisted of a wider track, and even maintaining backwards compatibility with older models. In addition, the car became more environmentally friendly with the use of recycled plastics, CFC-free air conditioning systems, and paint that did not contain heavy metals.

This generation of the car is widely credited for keeping Volkswagen from pulling out of the North American market. At the time of its introduction in 1993, Volkswagen of America's sales hit a low not seen since the 1950s. The division sold only 43,902 cars in that year. Sales began slowly due to the aforementioned issues at the Puebla plant. However, sales rebounded dramatically in the following years, mostly based on the strength of the Jetta, which continued to be the best-selling Volkswagen in the USA.

Fourth generation (A4, Typ 1J; 1999)

Production of the fourth generation car began in July 1999. Carrying on the wind nomenclature, the car was known as the Volkswagen Bora in much of the world. Bora is a winter wind which blows intermittently over the coast of the Adriatic Sea, as well as in parts of Greece, Russia, Turkey, and in the Sliven region of Bulgaria. In North America and South Africa, the Jetta moniker was again kept on due to the continued popularity of the car in those markets.

The Mk4 debuted shortly after its larger sibling, the Passat, with which it shared many styling cues. The rounded shape and arched roofline served as the new Volkswagen styling trademark, abandoning traditional sharp creases for more curved corners. A distinguishing feature of the Mk4 is its Whiptenna, a trademark for the antenna on the rear end of the roof, which claims to incur less drag than traditional antennas due to its short length and leeward position. For the first time, the rear passenger doors differed from those of a 5-door Golf. The car was also offered as an estate/wagon (whose rear doors are also non-interchangeable with the others). New on this generation was some advanced options such as rain sensor-controlled windshield wipers and automatic climate control. However, these were expensive extras and many buyers did not specify them on their cars; as a result, the used market has many sparsely equipped models.

Although slightly shorter overall than the Mark 3, the fourth generation saw the wheelbase extended slightly. Some powertrain options were carried over. Nevertheless, two new internal combustion engines were offered, the 1.8-litre turbo 4-cylinder (often referred to as the 1.8 20vT), and the VR6. The suspension setup remained much as before. However, it was softened considerably in most models to give a comfortable ride, which was met with some criticism as it was still quite hard in comparison with rivals such as vehicles offered from French carmakers.

Fifth generation (A5, Typ 1K5; 2005)

The fifth-generation debuted at the Los Angeles Auto Show on 5 January 2005. After the New Beetle, it was the second Volkswagen product to make its world debut at a U.S. auto show. The Mark 5 sedan went on sale in the USA prior to any other country, reflecting the importance of the car in that market for Volkswagen.

The fifth generation is marketed as the Jetta in most markets; as Bora in Mexico and Colombia; Vento in Argentina and Chile; and as the Sagitar in China. The Mark 5 is  longer,  wider, and has a  longer wheelbase than the previous iteration. Interior room has increased from 2.46 cubic metres (87 cu ft) to 2.58 cubic metres (91 cu ft). Luggage compartment volume is up to 453 litres (16 cu ft). One major change is the introduction of the first multi-link independent rear suspension in a Jetta. The design of the rear suspension has a strong resemblance to the one found in the Ford Focus. Volkswagen reportedly hired engineers from Ford who designed the suspension on the Focus.

Styling included a new chrome front grille, first seen on the Volkswagen Golf Mk5 R32, which has spread to other models. Some critics appreciated the new styling, whilst others dismissed it as just as bland as the 4th generation.

It is manufactured in the largest volumes in Mexico. VW spent US$800 million to upgrade its Puebla facilities for this model's production. This included a US$290 million new engine production line for the 5-cylinder power plant, a US$50 million investment in the press shop, as well as a US$200 million purchase of 460 robots, which increased automation by 80%. Final A5 assembly also took place also in China and South Africa for those markets. Like initial production of the second generation in China, the Asian and African plants build the car from a complete knock down (CKD) kit shipped from the factory in Puebla. Local assembly in Kaluga, Russia, started in early 2008. Production also began in India in 2008 at the Škoda factory in Aurangabad.

Sixth generation (A6, Typ 5C6; 2010)

The sixth-generation Volkswagen Jetta, known as the NCS (New Compact Sedan) during its development, was announced in the North American market on 16 June 2010. The A6 Jetta marked the departure from being a sedan derivative of the Golf, opting for a dedicated bodywork. It is partly based on the PQ35 platform shared with the Golf Mk6. The new model was larger and less expensive to manufacture than the previous generation making the vehicle more competitive against mainstream rivals in the compact car segment as part of Volkswagen's goal of reaching sales of 800,000 units in the North American market by 2018. The sixth generation Volkswagen Jetta was primarily designed by Volkswagen Mexico under the supervision of Volkswagen Germany.

Volkswagen's target of increasing its North American sales removed the Jetta from the premium compact car market. This forced many cost-cutting measures to be made for the North American models, which included a lower quality trim material for the interior and the replacement of leather with leatherette as an optional seating upholstery. Leather was still available on Canadian-spec models. The North American version also lost the multi-link rear suspension of the previous generation. The turbo hybrid version was unveiled in January 2012 at the North American International Auto Show, and was discontinued in 2016.

Seventh generation (A7; 2018)

The seventh-generation 2018 (2019 in United States) Volkswagen Jetta debuted at the 2018 North American International Auto Show in Detroit, Michigan, on 14 January 2018, after Volkswagen released an exterior design sketch in December 2017. The Jetta is based on Volkswagen's MQB platform, which underpins other Volkswagen vehicles including the Volkswagen Golf and the Volkswagen Atlas.

The Mk7 is larger than its predecessor, offers more interior room and has the latest generation of Volkswagen's infotainment systems, including integration of Apple CarPlay and Android Auto. Its ten-color customizable ambient interior lighting includes lighting across the dashboard and instrument panel, front and rear doors, footwells, and the gauge "rings" of a newly available fully digital instrument cluster display, marketed as the "Digital Cockpit".

As with its predecessors, production of the all-new 2019 Jetta will continue at Volkswagen's Puebla, Mexico Assembly Plant. The all-new Jetta will reach Volkswagen dealerships in the U.S. in the second quarter of 2018. A GLI model with a multi-link rear suspension is expected to come as a 2020 model. However, this new seventh-generation Jetta will not be sold in the European market.
The MK7 was recently launched in Korea ,where it has become one of the top selling imported models. 

The Chinese-spec long-wheelbase Volkswagen Sagitar was launched on January 19, 2019 both in Beijing and Shanghai; it is about 50 mm longer than the U.S.-spec model, and is equipped with independent suspension. This is an attempt to occupy the more upscale market than the Volkswagen Lavida built by SAIC-VW, which share similar looks. Production continues in the FAW-VW Chengdu plant.

Moving to 2022, the facelifted Volkswagen Jetta was revealed in Chicago. Bearing an updated look and design, the new C-segment sedan also gains added kit and a new engine. The 1.5 litre turbo four-cylinder replaces the long-serving 1.4 TSI. As for the GLI, it retains the EA888 2.0 litre four-cylinder turbo from the Golf GTI.

Alternative-propulsion cars
In 2001, at the 18th International Electric Vehicle Symposium and Exhibition in Berlin, Volkswagen released two environmentally friendly cars: the Bora HyMotion and the Bora Electric.

The Bora HyMotion was a hydrogen powered Mark 4 with a 75 kW fuel cell that could accelerate from 0 to 97 km/h (60 mph) in 12.5 seconds. With a 49-litre tank of cryogenically stored hydrogen, it had a range of 350 km (220 mi).

In 2002, Volkswagen, along with Paul Scherrer Institute released another hydrogen-powered car called the Bora Hy.Power. The car was powered by hydrogen compressed to a pressure of 320 bar (4600 psi). It had ratings very similar to the HyMotion; with a  power source. A special feature of the car was a 60-kilowatt supercapacitor which could boost power when needed and also recover energy when coasting.

Volkswagen had considered producing a mild hybrid version of the fifth-generation mainly for the North American market but never produced it.  In 2013 Volkswagen produced a turbocharged full hybrid sixth generation offering for the North American market.

Biofuels

Volkswagen released a Jetta MultiFuel in 1991, at first to the governments of the state of California and New York, and then for limited retail sale in those states to the public. They are an early example of an E85 vehicle, burning a mixture of 85% ethanol and 15% gasoline. These Jettas can still be found on U.S. roads.

Volkswagen also released a Bora TDI which was powered by SunFuel, a synthetic fuel developed in partnership with Royal Dutch Shell. The company also displayed Bora TDI powered by SunDiesel that Volkswagen also developed with DaimlerChrysler along with Choren Industries.

Use of the two most popular blends of biodiesel that are mostly biodiesel, B80 and B100, is not recommended in 2009 and 2010 US TDI engines.

In Brazil, until 2015, the Jetta was sold with the 2.0 L flex-fuel (marketed as "Total Flex") engine in Trendline and Comfortline trims. It could run on either E100 or Petrol. From 2016 model year onwards, the 2.0 L flex-fuel was replaced by the 1.4 L TSI turbocharged engine from EA211 family, that runs exclusively on petrol.

Electric vehicle
In the early 1980s, Volkswagen released a limited production electric Jetta called the Jetta CityStromer. It featured a 24.8 hp (18.5 kW) powertrain (later 37.5 hp (28 kW)), with a range of 190 km (250 km in the later version).

The second concept vehicle was called the Bora Electric. It had a power rating that varied according to the operating conditions. The Bora Electric could accelerate from 0 to 100 km/h in 10 seconds with a range of 160 km. It was powered by a Lithium-ion battery. It was noted that its chance of success was limited in the marketplace given the high cost of the electric drive system.

Awards and recognition
In November 2008 the VW Jetta TDI (clean diesel) won the 2009 Green Car of the Year awarded by Green Car Journal. As a result of the Volkswagen emissions scandal the award was rescinded.

Motorsport
From 2008 through 2010, Volkswagen and the Sports Car Club of America hosted the Volkswagen Jetta TDI Cup, using factory prepared 2009 Jetta TDIs.

For the 2010 SCCA World Challenge season, Irish Mike's Racing is campaigning GLIs in the touring car class. Todd Buras won rounds 1 and 2 at the Grand Prix of St. Petersburg and round 10 at Virginia International Raceway while Chip Herr won round 4 at Mosport.

Recalls
On 30 September 2011, Volkswagen of America announced a recall involving 2009–2012 Jetta and Jetta Sportwagen models with the 2.0L TDI engine; this recall pointed to a resonance condition with the number 2 fuel injector line and the fuel injector pulses, causing small cracks in the line which could leak.

Volkswagen emissions violations recall
In September 2015, it was discovered that some Volkswagen TDIs had exceeded the United States legal emissions limits. These emissions violations, which would later be referred to as Volkswagen's "emissionsgate" or "dieselgate", affected the 2.0 L TDI diesel engines (the engines from 2008 that would later be in the Volkswagen TDIs in North America).

Use in China
The Jetta has been built and produced in China since December 1991 by FAW-Volkswagen (FAW-VW), and the Jetta name itself has been used by FAW-VW as a new automotive brand starting in 2019.

Jetta A2 (1991–2013)

The first known Jetta was the A2 model that was used as a passenger car and a taxicab.

The A2 was then given a facelift in April 1997 where it was known as the Jetta King. Available engines were a 1.6 litre petrol engine called the EA113 for civilian cars and a 1.9 litre diesel engine only available for taxi models. A 4-speed manual gearbox was standard, which could be replaced by a 5-speed manual gearbox, and then a 4-speed automatic gearbox was made available from November 1998. For 2002, the Jetta King was facelifted with a new exterior. Trim levels consisted of the AT, ATF, Avantgarde, CDX, CiF, CiX, CT, GDF, GiF, GT, GTI, GTX and Meeresbrise. This model was also converted into a 2-door pickup truck in limited numbers.

The A2 was facelifted again in March 2010 with the same engines used by its predecessor; it was known as the Jetta Pioneer. This version of the Jetta was not offered in different trim levels and was a single model for the Chinese market. A2-based Jetta production ended in March 2013 where it was replaced by an independent model using the Volkswagen Group A05+ platform.

According to website Carsalesbase.com, FAW Volkswagen's Jetta A2 model sold over 2.4 million cars.

Bora A4 (2001–present)

The second known Jetta was the A4 model sold under the Bora name which commenced production in December 2001. It was given a facelift in 2006 and was available with the 1.6 and 1.8 litre EA113 petrol engine and a 1.9 litre diesel engine. A 5-speed manual was available alongside a 4-speed automatic transmission. A hatchback version was known as the Bora HS and was a badged Volkswagen Golf Mk4. Production for the first generation Bora ended in 2006 while the Bora HS ended production in 2008.

The Bora was facelifted in 2007 with two new engines, a 1.4 litre turbo and a 1.6, under the EA111 name. A 5-speed and 6-speed manual was standard alongside a 7-speed dual-clutch automatic gearbox. Production ended in 2015.

The third generation Bora commenced production in 2015 for the 2016 model year with a new exterior and interior. 1.4, 1.5 and 1.6 litre engines were standard paired to 5- and 6-speed manual and a 7-speed dual-clutch automatic gearbox. This generation is still available as of May 2019 as the Bora Classic with three trim levels.

The fourth generation Bora was produced since April 2018 and used Volkswagen's MQB platform. 1.4 and 1.5 litre engines were standard paired to a 6-speed manual and 7-speed dual-clutch automatic gearbox.

According to website Carsalesbase.com, FAW Volkswagen's Bora model sold over 2.6 million cars as of 2019.

Sagitar (2006–present) 

The third known Jetta example was known as the Sagitar and has been produced since April 2006. The Sagitar name was used for the fifth, sixth and seventh generation Jetta as FAW-Volkswagen already used the Jetta name on one of its models.

For the Mk1 Sagitar, a 1.6 litre engine was standard alongside a 1.8 litre turbo and 2 litre engine. The 2.0 litre was removed in 2009 to make way for a 1.4-litre turbocharged engine. Available gearboxes were a 5-speed manual, 6-speed automatic, and 7-speed dual-clutch automatic transmission.

The Mk2 Sagitar entered the market in March 2012. The Sagitar was available with the 1.4 litre turbo and 1.6 litre engine paired with a 5-speed manual gearbox for both engines, a 6-speed automatic gearbox for 1.6 models, and a 7-speed dual-clutch automatic for 1.4 models. 1.8 TSI models were available for 2014 followed by the 2.0 litre TSI for 2016 and 1.2 TSI for 2017 and 2018. The 2.0 litre TSI engine and 6-speed DSG combination are standard on Sagitar GLi models while the 1.4 litre turbo with the 7-speed dual-clutch gearbox is available on Sagitar R-Line models. The Mk2 Sagitar ended production in September 2019.

Its successor, the Mk3 Sagitar was launched in January 2019. A 1.4 and 1.5 litre EA211 engine was standard paired to a 5 speed manual and 6-speed automatic gearbox.

According to Carsalesbase.com, the Sagitar has had 2.8 million units sold in China as of 2019.

New Jetta/Jetta VA3 (2013–present) 

The Volkswagen New Jetta was introduced in March 2013 replacing the Chinese built A2 model and is a China-built exclusive. The New Jetta was paired with two new Volkswagen engines under the codename EA211 with displacements of 1.4 litres and 1.6 litres respectively. The EA211 firstly made its debut in the fifth generation Volkswagen Santana in 2012. For horsepower ratings, the 1.4 litre unit produced 66 kilowatts (88 horsepower), while the latter produced 81 kilowatts (108 horsepower). Transmission options consist of a 5 speed manual or a 6 speed automatic. Trim levels were known as Avantgarde (时尚), Comfortline (舒适) and Luxury (豪华) and pricing in 2013 ranged between 82,800 yuan and 119,300 yuan ($12,820 to $18,470 US - February 2021 exchange rate).

The New Jetta was given a facelift in 2017 with a new front and rear design and a brand new 1.5 litre engine producing 82 kilowatts (110 horsepower). A 7 speed dual clutch gearbox comes standard for the 230TSI model. To differentiate this version with 2013 type, the selling name was branded as "New Jetta 2017" (in Chinese: “新捷达2017款”). Production for the New Jetta ended in March 2020. According to Carsalesbase.com, the new Jetta model achieved 1.9 million units sold.

A new car marque was launched in China in February 2019 known as Jetta and one of the models, the Jetta VA3 is a facelifted and rebadged New Jetta. According to pictures found on Chinese car website Autohome, the Jetta VA3 was to be powered by two engines, a 1.4 litre turbo and the 1.5 litre naturally aspirated EA211 four cylinder engine.  The VA3 was officially listed in September 2019 and the 1.5 litre EA211 is available paired to a 5 speed manual and 6 speed automatic gearbox. Pricing ranges between 65,800 and 92,800 yuan with 4 trim levels (10,185 and US$13,365 - February 2021 exchange rate). According to Carsalesbase.com, the Jetta VA3 model sold 12,384 cars in 2019 and 42,376 in 2020.

Sales

See also
 Volkswagen Jetta (China)
 List of modern production plug-in electric vehicles

References

External links

 Test Drive: VOLKSWAGEN Jetta 1.4 TSI (122 HP) - 2009 by Autoevolution.com
 VW JETTA (USA)

Cars introduced in 1979
1980s cars
1990s cars
2000s cars
2010s cars
Jetta
Euro NCAP small family cars
Front-wheel-drive vehicles
All-wheel-drive vehicles
Partial zero-emissions vehicles
Compact cars
Sedans
Station wagons
Police vehicles
Rally cars
Touring cars
Cars powered by VR engines